Trichophantasis is a genus of longhorn beetles of the subfamily Lamiinae, containing the following species:

 Trichophantasis grandicollis (Breuning, 1967)
 Trichophantasis subtuberculata (Breuning, 1967)

References

Phantasini